Oinoi (before 1927: Όσιανη - Osiani) is a village in Kastoria Regional Unit, Macedonia, Greece.

The Greek census (1920) recorded 824 people in the village and in 1923 there were 841 inhabitants (or 145 families) who were Muslim. Following the Greek-Turkish population exchange, in 1926 within Osiani there were 154 refugee families from Pontus. The Greek census (1928) recorded 602 village inhabitants. There were 153 refugee families (565 people) in 1928.

References

Populated places in Kastoria (regional unit)